Yellow Cat is a 2020 Kazakhstani comedy-drama film directed by Adilkhan Yerzhanov. It was selected as the Kazakhstani entry for the Best International Feature Film at the 94th Academy Awards.

Cast
 Azamat Nigmanov as Kermek
 Kamila Nugmanova as Eva
 Sanjar Madi as Zhambas

See also
 List of submissions to the 94th Academy Awards for Best International Feature Film
 List of Kazakhstani submissions for the Academy Award for Best International Feature Film

References

External links
 

2020 films
2020 comedy-drama films
Kazakhstani drama films
Kazakh-language films